Arizona is a town, with a population of 5,779 (2013 census), and a municipality in the Honduran department of Atlántida.

The villages of Cangelica, Chiquito, El Cedro, El Coco, El Retiro, Hicaque, Jilamo, Las Palmas, Los Bolos, Matarras, Mezapa, Mojiman, Oropendolas, Planes de Hicaque, Quebradas de Arena, Santa Maria, Uluasito and Zapote are located in Arizona.

History

On 29 October 2022, the municipality decided in an open council against the construction of a hydroelectric power plant, as well as against concessions for model cities and mining projects in the region.

References

External links
MUNICIPIO DE ARIZONA - SECRETARÍA DE GOBERNACIÓN Y JUSTICIA 

Municipalities of the Atlántida Department